Apistogramma taeniata is a small freshwater fish from the lower Tapajós River basin in Brazil.
It is a dwarf cichlid.

References

taeniata
Fish described in 1862
Taxa named by Albert Günther